Philip James may refer to:
 Philip Frederick Wright James (17 May 1890 – 1 November 1975) an American composer, conductor and music educator.
 Philip Seaforth James (28 May 1914 – 5 May 2001) a barrister, academic, author and soldier.
 Philip J. K. James (born 30 June 1978) is a British entrepreneur, adventurer and CEO of Penrose Hill
 Phil Nyokai James (born 1954) is a teacher, performer and avant-garde composer

See also
 James (surname)